Christmas Story is a 2007 Finnish Christmas drama film directed by Juha Wuolijoki. It is the story of how an orphan called Nikolas became Santa Claus.

Plot
Many years ago, in Lapland, a boy named Nikolas is orphaned when his family are killed in an accident. The heads of the families in the village meet to decide his future and, as life in the arctic is difficult, it is decided that as no one family could care for him permanently, they would raise him communally, with each family taking him for one year and then moving him on to the next. Grateful, Nikolas begins whittling toys out of wood as a gift which, each Christmas, he leaves for the family that cared for him. It becomes a tradition from then, with Nikolas never forgets the children of those families that received him each year. When a blight hits the village, and none of the families can afford to take him in for the next year, he is taken in by grumpy hermit Iisakki as his carpenter's apprentice. Iisakki works him hard but Nikolas is clever and quick to learn, and Iisakki gradually grows to love Nikolas as his own son. Nikolas begins to live more and more for the spirit of Christmas with each passing year and it becomes his life and as he grows old he becomes the figure known as Santa Claus.

Cast
 Hannu-Pekka Björkman – Nikolas
 Otto Gustavsson – Young Nikolas
 Kari Väänänen – Iisakki
 Minna Haapkylä – Kristiina
 Mikko Leppilampi – Hannus
 Mikko Kouki – Eemeli
 Laura Birn – Aada
 Antti Tuisku – Mikko
 Matti Ristinen – Einari
 Ville Virtanen – Henrik
 Matti Rasilainen – Hermanni

See also
Klaus (film), 2019 animation with a similar plot
 List of Christmas films
 Santa Claus in film

References

External links 
 
 Christmas Story on Cineuropa

2007 films
Finnish Christmas drama films
Finnish fantasy films
2000s Christmas drama films
2007 drama films
Films set in Lapland
2000s Finnish-language films
Santa Claus in film